"Like I Love You" is the debut solo single of American singer-songwriter Justin Timberlake from his debut studio album, Justified (2002), which features American hip hop duo Clipse. It was co-written by Timberlake and the Neptunes (Chad Hugo and Pharrell Williams), who also produced it. The song was released on September 16, 2002, as Timberlake's debut solo single, following the announced hiatus of NSYNC earlier that year. According to Williams, the song's drums were an ode to the funk era.

The song peaked at number 11 on the US Billboard Hot 100 and number two in the United Kingdom. It was performed by Timberlake at the 2002 MTV Video Music Awards in New York City, on August 29, 2002. It also received a nomination at the Grammy Awards of 2003 for Best Rap/Sung Collaboration.

Writing and recording 

MTV News reported in July 2002 that Chad Hugo and Pharrell Williams (known collectively as the Neptunes) were working on multiple tracks for Justified. When the duo picked Timberlake up from his hotel in Virginia Beach, they listened to Earth, Wind & Fire albums during the car ride. The background of the songs was the feeling the duo wanted to implement into the musical content of the album. In response to this, Timberlake said: "Nobody's ever heard anything like that before ... a white boy singing this kind of music." Hugo revealed that Timberlake "didn't care what people would say." The production duo commented that despite not being content with sampling music, for inspiration, they listened to both Off the Wall and Thriller, albums by Michael Jackson. Hugo commented that "We just wanted to re-create that sense of those timeless, classic songs, without any of the 'bling, bling, hit me on my two-way' style of the new R&B. It has elements of the old and the new."

"Like I Love You" was the first song they recorded together and the first song Timberlake recorded for Justified. The song was written by Timberlake, Hugo and Williams, while the production was done by the latter two. The song features a rap verse written and performed by hip hop duo Clipse. "Like I Love You" was recorded at Master Sound Recording Studios and Windmark Recording both located in Virginia Beach with Andrew Coleman serving as a recording engineer. Serban Ghenea mixed the song at Windmark Recording, while Daniel Botancourt and Tim Roberts were additional engineers. John Hanes provided the additional Pro Tools engineering. All the instrumentation was delivered by Hugo and Williams, while the song's vocal arrangement was provided by Williams together with Timberlake.

Release
"Like I Love You" was chosen as Timberlake's debut single and the lead single of Justified. According to Timberlake, there was "never any question" in his mind whether or not the song would be released as his debut single. Of the song, Timberlake said: "It sounded so original to me. And I kind of consider myself a new artist.

On October 14, 2002, a CD single was released in Germany containing the album version of the song, its instrumental and two club extended mixes. The same version of the single was released in Canada on October 17, 2002. In the UK, the album version of "Like I Love You", its instrumental and one extended remix was physically released on October 21, 2002. The song was released as a 12-inch single on November 19, 2002, in Italy and Spain. On November 24, 2002, it was also released in France as a CD single.

Critical reception

The song received positive reviews from music critics. Entertainment Weeklys Craig Seymour wrote "Over a lo-fi Neptunes-produced track dashed with Spanish guitar, live drums, and Planet Rock-like electro bleeps... [Justin proves that] while no innovator, he is a fine student". In his review of the album Justified for Rolling Stone, Ben Ratliff wrote "In Like I Love You, a nasty funk rhythm on loud, live drums shares the space with a tiny guitar strum and Timberlake's breathy, studied tenor; it's minimalism influenced by Michael Jackson. But a softer, harmony-and-hook-filled chorus sets it off, thus pleasing preteen girls and beat junkies alike."

Denise Boyd, writing for BBC Music, said that the song was a "sure bet for success" with the Neptunes producing the song but "Justin's vocal arrangement has given this offering a distinctive edge and it stands out as one of the best Neptunes productions this year." Slant Magazine called it a "well-oiled Neptunes production" and "the acoustic guitar loops and snap-crackle-pop percussion of "Like I Love You" pick up where NSYNC's hit "Girlfriend" left off."

In 2013, Lauren Nostro from Complex wrote, "The song catapulted Timberlake's career... It was the quintessential R&B/pop/hip-hop track filled with soulful lyrics and a heavy beat. It presented JT as a full-fledged musician, and not just the lead singer of 'N Sync." Adelle Platon from Billboard opined in 2016, "This groovy number cemented J.T.'s solo career as a genre-fusing wunderkind." In 2017, Spin staff ranked it as the best boy-band solo debut single.

Chart performance
"Like I Love You" debuted on the US Billboard Hot 100 at number 67 for the issue dated September 7, 2002. The next week it climbed to number 46. It eventually reached a peak of number 11 and stayed on the chart for 36 weeks. The song was more successful on the US Pop Songs and Hot Dance Club Songs charts where it peaked at number four and one respectively. Additionally it charted on the US Hot R&B/Hip-Hop Songs chart where reached a peak of 53. The song was more successful in Oceania. On the Australian Singles Chart, the song debuted at number nine for the week dated October 27, 2002. The next week it fell to number 11, before eventually reaching its peak of number eight in its third week and remaining there for three consecutive weeks. "Like I Love You" stayed on the chart for a total of twelve weeks and was certified platinum by the Australian Recording Industry Association (ARIA) for shipments of 70,000 units. It debuted and peaked at number six on the New Zealand Singles Chart for the week dated November 10, 2002, staying on the chart for twelve weeks.

In the United Kingdom, "Like I Love You" debuted at its peak of number two for the issue dated November 2, 2002. It stayed on the chart for  16 weeks, making its last appearance on February 15, 2003, at number 57. The song debuted and peaked at number five on the Irish Singles Chart. "Like I Love You" debuted and peaked at number four on the Danish Singles Chart, managing to stay at the position for two consecutive weeks before starting to fall on the chart. It stayed on the chart for total of 14 weeks. The single debuted at number 14 on the Norwegian Singles Chart for the week dated October 25, 2002. After three weeks, it managed to peak at number 10 on the chart. Additionally, the song charted and peaked at number 14 on the Swiss Singles Chart.

Music video

Background
The official music video was released on September 9, 2002, as featured in an episode of MTV's Making the Video. It was filmed in Weston, Ontario, Canada, and was directed by Diane Martel from August 22–24, 2002. As of May 2020, the music video has over 85.5 million views on YouTube.

Synopsis
The video is spliced into three parts; Justin Timberlake dancing outside a 7-Eleven store at night wearing a 7-Eleven shirt and red beanie, Timberlake inside an arcade wearing a leather jacket and snapback, and close-up shots of Timberlake singing to the camera. Clipse and Pharrell Williams both appear during Clipse's rap verse in the arcade alongside Timberlake.

Live performances
Timberlake made his debut solo performance at the 2002 MTV Video Music Awards, performing "Like I Love You" on August 29, 2002. The song was also included on the setlist for The Justified World Tour, Justified and Stripped Tour, FutureSex/LoveShow, Legends of the Summer, The 20/20 Experience World Tour and The Man of the Woods Tour.

Credits and personnel
Credits are adapted from the liner notes of Justified.

Recording and mixing
 Recorded at Master Sound Recording Studios and Windmark Recording, Virginia Beach; mixed at Windmark Recording, Virginia Beach.

Personnel

 Songwriting – Justin Timberlake, Chad Hugo, Pharrell Williams
 Production – The Neptunes
 Rap Verse – Clipse
 Recording – Andrew Coleman
 Mixing – Serban Ghenea

 Assistant engineers – Daniel Botancourt, Tim Roberts
 Additional Pro Tools Engineering – John Hanes
 All instruments – Pharrell Williams, Chad Hugo
 Vocal arrangement – Justin Timberlake, Pharrell Williams

Charts

Weekly charts

Year-end charts

Certifications

Release history

See also
 List of number-one dance singles of 2003 (U.S.)

References

2002 debut singles
2002 songs
Clipse songs
Jive Records singles
Justin Timberlake songs
Music videos directed by Diane Martel
Song recordings produced by the Neptunes
Songs written by Chad Hugo
Songs written by Justin Timberlake
Songs written by Pharrell Williams
UK Independent Singles Chart number-one singles